Hibbertia, commonly known as guinea flowers, is a genus of flowering plants in the family Dilleniaceae. They are usually shrubs with simple leaves and usually yellow flowers with five sepals and five petals. There are about 400 species, most of which occur in Australia but a few species occur in New Guinea, New Caledonia, Fiji and Madagascar.

Description
Plants in the genus Hibbertia are usually shrubs, rarely climbers, and often form mats. Their leaves are usually arranged alternately along the stems, usually sessile, clustered on short side-branches, and have smooth, rarely toothed or lobed edges. The flowers are usually arranged singly in leaf axils or on the ends of stems and have five sepals, two "outer" sepals slightly overlapping the three "inner" ones. There are five yellow, rarely orange, petals and the stamens are usually arranged in three to five groups, sometimes on only one side of the carpels. There are between two and five carpels, usually free from each other, each containing up to six ovules and with a style on the top. The fruit is a follicle containing seeds, usually with an aril.

Taxonomy and naming
The genus Hibbertia was first formally described in 1800 by Henry Cranke Andrews in his book The Botanist's Repository for New, and Rare Plants and the first species he described was H. volubilis, now known as H. scandens. The name Hibbertia honours George Hibbert, a patron of botany. The common name, guinea flower reflects the resemblance of the flowers to the colour and shape of the guinea coin.

Species list
See List of Hibbertia species

References

 
Eudicot genera
Taxa named by Henry Cranke Andrews